Shinabad may refer to:
 Shinabad, Miandoab
 Shinabad, Piranshahr